The  also known as  is a park in Osaka, Japan

It was established in April 1923 as the city athletic field which hosted the 1923 Far Eastern Championship Games. It later became a venue for international trade fairs. It currently hosts the Osaka Municipal Central Gymnasium, and Osaka Pool, a swimming and ice rink facility.

References

Parks and gardens in Osaka
Sports venues in Osaka